Polymorphomyia footei is a species of tephritid or fruit flies in the genus Polymorphomyia of the family Tephritidae.

Distribution
Peru.

References

Tephritinae
Insects described in 1971
Diptera of South America